The Ghanaian Chronicle is an English-language daily newspaper published from Accra, Ghana. It has a circulation of 45,000 copies, making it the biggest private newspaper in Ghana.

See also
Media of Ghana
List of newspapers in Ghana

References

External links
The Ghanaian Chronicle website
The Ghanaian Chronicle

Newspapers published in Ghana
English-language newspapers published in Africa
Publications with year of establishment missing
Mass media in Accra